Panorama is an annual music competition of steelbands from Trinidad and Tobago, taking place since 1963. It is usually held around Carnival time.

History
The first official Trinidad Panorama was held during Carnival celebrations in 1963. It was originally pioneered by Chairman of the Carnival Development Committee, Ronald Jay Williams, who gave the festival its name. Similarly styled "Panorama" steelband competitions are also staged at Carnival time in other Caribbean communities.

Typically, each steelpan orchestra plays a popular Calypso that is arranged into a piece with original introductions and variations. 

As part of the International Conference on Pan (ICP) in August 2015, Trinidad hosted the International Panorama Competition. The international edition of Panorama was held over a two-day period, 8–9 August 2015. The competition brought together participants from the approximately 38 steelband-playing countries from around the world to compete against each other for the title of ICP Champions 2015.

In 1979, Panorama in Trinidad was not held due to Rudolph Charles' fight for higher recognition of pannists. The competition was again cancelled in 2021 and 2022 due to the COVID-19 pandemic.

It is held in Queen's Park Savannah, Port of Spain.

Past winners

List of past winners in the category Large Band:

Readings
 Felix I. R. Blake, The Trinidad and Tobago Steel Pan: History and Evolution, 1995.

References

External links
 Trinidad Panorama 2020 | Complete Panorama results and more on panscore.com
 Leroy "Jughead" Gordon, "The Story of Pan in Antigua", When Steel Talks.
  Panorama on YouTube

Steelpan music
Recurring events established in 1963
1963 establishments in North America